Zalishchyky Park or Lordly Park officially called Lower Park is an urban park/natural monument or zakaznik located on a natural terrace on the left bank of the Dniester River in southern Zalishchyky, in the Ternopil Oblast of western Ukraine. The park is home to more than 45 unique and exotic species of fauna, including the Maidenhair tree, red oak, European horse-chesnut, Amur cork tree, and Tartarian honeysuckle.

Established in the late 19th century, the park remains one of the oldest operational parks in the Ternopil Oblast. The park has been maintained by Ukraine's Nature Preservation Fund since 1972.

Together with the Zalishchyky Central Park, the park is part of the Dniester Canyon National nature park.

References 
Zalishchyky
Parks in Ukraine
1972 establishments in Ukraine
1972 establishments in the Soviet Union
Protected areas of Ukraine
Botanical gardens in Ukraine
Tourist attractions in Ternopil Oblast
Geography of Ternopil Oblast